Noel Nelson (born 13 April 1967) is a former Irish first-class cricketer.

Nelson was born at Banbridge in County Down in April 1967, and was educated at Banbridge Academy. An all-rounder at club level, he played one first-class cricket match for Ireland against Scotland at Edinburgh in 1990. In a drawn match, Nelson batted once and was dismissed without scoring by Craig McKnight. He also bowled fifteen overs with his medium pace, but failed to take a wicket. He toured Zimbabwe in March 1991, playing six minor fixtures. Following this tour, he was not selected again for Ireland, beginning a career as an operations manager instead. His brother, Alan Nelson, also played first-class cricket for Ireland. More recently, his nephew, Lee Nelson, has played first-class cricket for the Northern Knights.

References

External links

1967 births
Living people
People from Banbridge
People educated at Banbridge Academy
Cricketers from Northern Ireland
Irish cricketers